Melvin Jones may refer to:
Melvin Jones (Lions Club) (1879–1961), secretary-treasurer of Lions Clubs International
Melvin Jones (American football) (born 1954), American football player
Melvyn "Deacon" Jones (1943–2017), keyboard player and founding member of Baby Huey & the Babysitters